Perfect Sound Forever may refer to:

 Perfect Sound Forever (EP), by Pavement, 1991
 Perfect Sound Forever (book), a 2004 biography about Pavement by Rob Jovanovic
 Perfect Sound Forever (magazine), an online music magazine